is a town located in Oshima Subprefecture, Hokkaido, Japan.

Demographics
As of September 2016, the town has an estimated population of 4,620, and a density of 23 persons per km².

Geography
Shiriuchi is located on the southwest of the Oshima Peninsula and faces Tsugaru Strait. Shiriuchi River flows through the town.

The total area is 196.66 km².

Neighboring towns
 Oshima Subprefecture
 Kikonai
 Fukushima
 Hiyama Subprefecture
 Kaminokuni

History
1906: Shiriuchi village was founded.
1967: Shiriuchi village became Shiriuchi town.

Transportation
Kaikyō Line runs through the town, and the entrance of the Seikan Tunnel is in Yunosato. There used to be Shiriuchi Station, but it closed in March 2014.

Education
 High school
 Hokkaido Shiriuchi High School

Sister town
 Imabetsu, Aomori (since 1990)

Notable people from Shiriuchi
Saburō Kitajima,  enka singer, lyricist and composer

References

External links

Official Website 

Towns in Hokkaido